The British Curry Awards is an annual awards dinner dedicated to the British curry industry. It was established in 2005 by Enam Ali and has continued to this day. Each individual award is split for geographic purposes — regional splits of Scotland, North West, North East, Midlands, Wales, South East, South West, London Central and City, and London Suburbs — and expertise. The awards themselves are in association with JustEat.com, an online food delivery service. The 16th edition of the British Curry Awards is set to take place on the date TBC December 2020  at the Battersea Evolution.

Winners

The list of winners at the British Curry Awards 2018 is as follows:

 Best in North East: Mumtaz, Bradford 
 Best in North West: Indique, Manchester
 Best in Casual Dining: Dabbawal High Bridge, Newcastle 
 Best in London City and Suburbs: Baluchi, Tooley Street, SE1
 Inspiration Award: Asha's, Birmingham  
 Best in Wales: Rasoi Waterfront, Swansea
 Best Newcomer: Dishoom, Edinburgh 
 Best in South East: Malik's Cookham, Maidenhead
 Best in Scotland: Light of Bengal, Aberdeen 
 Best in South West: Koloshi Indian Restaurant, Cheltenham
 Best in Midlands: Pushkar, Birmingham 
 Best Takeaway: Chilli Tuk Tuk, London N12
 Special Recognition Award: Chef Rezual Karim from Stockholm

Winners at British Curry Awards 2017 were:

 Best Spice Restaurant in Scotland: Sanam Tandoori, Falkirik
 Best Spice Restaurant in North West: Viceroy Carlisle
 Best Spice Restaurant in North East: Mumbai Lounge, York
 Best Spice Restaurant in Wales: Rasoi Indian Kitchen, Swansea
 Best Spice Restaurant in Midlands: Asha's Indian Bar & Kitchen, Birmingham
 Best Spice Restaurant in South West: Koloshi, Cheltenham
 Best Spice Restaurant in South East: Malik's Cookham
 Best Spice Restaurant in London Outer & Suburbs: Shampan Bromley
 Best Spice Restaurant in Central London & City: Cinnamon Club, Westminster
 Best Casual Dining: Dabbawal Jesmond
 Best Newcomer: Dishoom, Kings Cross
 Best Takeaway: Chilli Pickle, Brighton

The winners for 2016's British Curry Awards are as follows:

 Best casual dining restaurant: Dishoom, Covent Garden, London
 Best newcomer: Darbaar, Shoreditch, London
 Best delivery service: The Chilli Pickle, Brighton
 Best in the North West: Blue Tiffin, Royton, Oldham
 Best in Wales: Sheesh Mahal, Llanelli
 Best in the Midlands: Asha's, Birmingham
 Best of South East: Maliks, Gerrards Cross, Buckinghamshire
 Best in Scotland: Karma, Whitburn, Bathgate
 Best in London Central and City: The Cinnamon Club, Westminster, London
 Best in the North East: Aakash, Cleckheaton, West Yorkshire
 Best in London Suburbs: Shampan Welling, Bexley
 Best in the South West: Prithvi, Cheltenham, Gloucestershire

The winners for 2015's British Curry Awards are as follows 

 Best casual dining restaurant: Dabbawal
 Best newcomer: Calcutta Club
 Best delivery service: The Chilli Pickle, Brighton
 Best in the North West: The Viceroy In Carlisle
 Best in Wales: Sheesh Mahal, Llanelli
 Best in the Midlands: Pushkar
 Best of South East: Shampan at The Spinning Wheel
 Best in Scotland: Karma, Scotland
 Best in London Central and City: The Cinnamon Club, Westminster, London
 Best in the North East: Aagrah Leeds
 Best in London Suburbs: Green Spice
 Best in the South West: Spice Lodge

References

External links
 

2005 establishments in the United Kingdom
Awards established in 2005
Food and drink awards
British awards
Bangladeshi cuisine in the United Kingdom
Indian cuisine in the United Kingdom
Pakistani cuisine in the United Kingdom
Annual events in the United Kingdom